Rugby league is a team sport that is played in several regions of Spain. 

A competition was formed in Catalonia by the Associació Catalana de Rugby Lliga in 2008 and ran for three seasons. The sport returned to Spain with the formation of the Spanish Rugby League Association in 2013. New clubs have subsequently formed in the Valencian Community, Madrid, and Andalucia.

History
On 30 May 1993, XIII Catalan (of Perpignan) and the Huddersfield Giants contested the Alex Angel Trophy at Estadi Olímpic Lluís Companys in Barcelona. Huddersfield won 23–22.

Perpignan-based professional club Catalans Dragons have hosted two matches in Barcelona, in 2009 and 2019. A crowd of 31,555 at the latter game, played at Camp Nou against the Wigan Warriors, set a regular season attendance record for a standalone Super League match.

Governing body

The governing body for the sport in Spain is the Spanish Rugby League Association, which was formed in 2013.

Competitions
The first competition under a Spanish governing body (see Rugby league in Catalonia for previous history) began in 2014 with five clubs.

National team

The Spain national rugby league team was formed in 2014 and defeated  in their first match. By beating Latvia in a playoff and then Malta and Greece in an initial qualifying group in 2015, they advanced to the final qualifying stage for the 2017 Rugby League World Cup, where they were placed in a three team group (Pool B) alongside Russia and Ireland. Their first result was a 6-40 loss to Russia, at Fili Stadium, Moscow on 15 October 2016, and their second a 46-6 defeat by Ireland, which resulted in their elimination.

See also

Sport in Spain
Sport in Catalonia
Rugby league in Catalonia

References

External links
Official website